Sarban may refer to:

Sarbans, or Sarbani, the largest tribal confederation of Pashtuns from Afghanistan and Pakistan.
Sarban-e Damuyi, a village in Iran
Sarban (singer), full name Abdul Rahim Sarban, Afghani popular singer
Sarban (author), full name John William Wall,  British writer and diplomat